SuperNova Records is an independent record label founded and operated by Steve Austin, the frontman of the American noise rock band Today Is the Day. The name was first used in 1992 for the release of the band's demo album titled How to Win Friends and Influence People and the name was then used for the creation of the label in 2006. The label's initial purpose was to reissue then out-of-print Today Is the Day albums and to release video recordings of live performances of the band from the 1990s. Later Austin began to sign and promote other bands.

During its initial run, SuperNova had a distribution and manufacturing deal with Sony, and to help fund the label Austin sold his firearm collection. In 2008, the label released a film based on the Today Is the Day album Axis of Eden as a digital download. By 2010, the label shut down due to the stress of the business side of running the label.

The label was resurrected in 2021 after Austin obtained the masters to Today Is the Day's back catalogue, with the intentions to reissue the bands music through streaming services as well as issue music from up-and-coming artists.

Artists

The Admirals Club
Christine
Complete Failure
Defcon 4
Diesel Theory
F.U.C.T.
GERMZ
Hope And Suicide
The Orange Man Theory
Roanoke
Taipan
Today Is the Day
Trampskirts
Woorms

Discography

References

External links
 Current Webpage
 Bandcamp
 Discogs
 Old Webpage (Archive)

Record labels established in 2006
Defunct record labels of the United States
American independent record labels